Please Turn Over is a 1959 British comedy film written by Norman Hudis, produced by Peter Rogers and directed by Gerald Thomas. It featured Ted Ray, Julia Lockwood, Jean Kent, Joan Sims, Leslie Phillips, Charles Hawtrey, Lionel Jeffries and Victor Maddern. The screenplay concerns an English town that is thrown into chaos when the daughter of one of the residents publishes a book detailing the supposed secrets of the inhabitants. It was based on the play Book of the Month by Basil Thomas.

The various story threads are unconnected other than that they are all covered within the controversial book.

The sexually ambiguous and provocative title is typical of British comedies of the period and has no direct link to the plot and only tangentially connects as a phrase that the doctor might say. It refers to a message commonly printed at the bottom of a card printed on two sides.

Plot
In a quiet English town, seventeen-year-old Jo Halliday lives a fairly boring life working as a hairdresser and living at home, with her nagging mother, pompous father (Ted Ray), and fitness-obsessed aunt. Her father, an accountant, continually wishes that his dreamy, untidy daughter could be more like his secretary, Miss Millicent.

One morning, the local newspaper reveals that Jo has written a book—Naked Revolt—which is an instant bestseller. It tells the story of a young girl who discovers the truth about her family and neighbours, and flees to London to become a prostitute.

Unfortunately, the town's residents believe the book to be a true portrait of the family. Her father finds himself under suspicion at work, as his colleagues believe he has been stealing money, and her mother is regarded as a harlot who has been conducting a twenty-year affair with a retired army officer (Lionel Jeffries) who gives her driving lessons and is Jo's real father. Her local doctor (Leslie Phillips) is portrayed as a philanderer who is sexually involved with a number of his patients while ignoring the desperate advances of his drunken assistant, Jo's aunt.

In fact, none of this is true: her father is scrupulously honest and in love with her mother; the local doctor is a shy man, and the former army officer is simply a family friend. Jo has left town for London with a young playwright, Robert Hughes, who is interested in turning her book into a play. After discovering they are kindred spirits, the two become engaged.

When they return home, Jo is confronted by her angry family and neighbours. The doctor is threatening to sue, and her father and mother have begun questioning each other's fidelity.

Cast
 Ted Ray - Edward Halliday
 Jean Kent - Janet Halliday
 Leslie Phillips - Dr. Henry Manners
 Joan Sims - Beryl, the maid
 Julia Lockwood - Jo Halliday
 Tim Seely - Robert Hughes, the playwright
 Charles Hawtrey - Jewellery Salesman
 Dilys Laye - Miss Jones, the secretary
 Lionel Jeffries - Ian Howard, the driving instructor
 June Jago - Gladys Worth, the Aunt
 Colin Gordon - Maurice
 Joan Hickson - Saleswoman
 Victor Maddern - Man at station
 Ronald Adam - Mr. Appleton
 Cyril Chamberlain - Mr. Jones
 Marianne Stone - Mrs. Waring 
 Anthony Sagar - Barman
 Lee Patterson - Rod

Box Office
Kine Weekly called it a "money maker" at the British box office in 1960.

References

External links

1959 films
British comedy films
1950s English-language films
1959 comedy films
Films directed by Gerald Thomas
Films shot at Pinewood Studios
Films produced by Peter Rogers
Films with screenplays by Norman Hudis
British films based on plays
1950s British films